Nicolas Rajsel (born 31 May 1993) is a Slovenian footballer who plays as a winger for Belgian club Dender.

Career

Club
On 4 February 2020, Rajsel signed a one-and-a-half-year contract with Azerbaijani club Gabala FK.

On 6 September 2021, Rajsel signed a one-year contract with Sabail.

Career statistics

Club

References

External links
 
NZS profile 

1993 births
Sportspeople from Pontoise
Footballers from Val-d'Oise
French people of Slovenian descent
Slovenian people of French descent
Living people
French footballers
Slovenian footballers
Slovenia under-21 international footballers
Association football wingers
NK Celje players
Royale Union Saint-Gilloise players
K.V. Oostende players
K.S.V. Roeselare players
Gabala FC players
Sabail FK players
F.C.V. Dender E.H. players
Championnat National 2 players
Slovenian PrvaLiga players
Challenger Pro League players
Belgian Pro League players
Azerbaijan Premier League players
Slovenian expatriate footballers
Expatriate footballers in Belgium
Slovenian expatriate sportspeople in Belgium
Expatriate footballers in Azerbaijan
Slovenian expatriate sportspeople in Azerbaijan